The 1950 Dutch Grand Prix was a motor race held on 23 July 1950 at Circuit Park Zandvoort, Netherlands. It was the first Dutch Grand Prix open to Formula One cars.  The race was won by French driver Louis Rosier in a Talbot-Lago.

Classification

Qualifying

Race

References

Dutch Grand Prix
Dutch Grand Prix
Grand Prix
Dutch Grand Prix